Kollmann is a German occupational surname, which means "coal miner" or "coal seller", from the Middle High German Kol "coal" and Mann "man". Alternative spellings include Köllmann, Kollman and Kolmann. The name may refer to:

Arthur Kollmann (1858–1941) German medical researcher
Augustus Frederic Christopher Kollmann (1756–1829), German composer 
Christina Kollmann (born 1988), Austrian cyclist
Gabriele Köllmann (born 1960), German slalom canoeist
Jeffrey Kollman (born 1968), American musician
Julius Kollmann (1834–1918), German scientist
Nancy Kollmann (born 1950), American historian
Peter Kollman (1944–2001), American chemist 
Petr Kolmann (born 1988), Czech ice hockey player
Roland Kollmann (born 1976), Austrian football player 
Walter Kollmann (born 1932), Austrian football player

References

German-language surnames
Surnames of German origin